Camille Martin (born 1956) is a Canadian poet and collage artist. After residing in New Orleans for fourteen years, in 2005 she moved to Toronto following Hurricane Katrina.

Biography

Early life and education
Camille Martin was born in El Dorado, Arkansas, in 1956 and spent most of her childhood in Lafayette, Louisiana. In 1980 she earned a Master of Music in Piano Performance and Literature from the Eastman School of Music. In 1996 she received a Master of Fine Arts in Poetry from the University of New Orleans. Her thesis, a collection of poems entitled at peril, passed with distinction. In 2003 she received a PhD in English from Louisiana State University. Her dissertation, Radical Dialectics in the Experimental Poetry of Berssenbrugge, Hejinian, Harryman, Weiner, and Scalapino, won the Lewis P. Simpson Distinguished Dissertation Award. She has received grants for poetry from the Louisiana Division of the Arts, the Canada Council for the Arts, the Ontario Arts Council, the Toronto Arts Council, and the League of Canadian Poets.

Career
Martin is the author of five full-length poetry collections: Blueshift Road (Rogue Embryp Press, 2021),Looms (Shearsman Books, 2012), Sonnets Shearsman Books, 2010), Codes of Public Sleep (Toronto: BookThug, 2007), and Sesame Kiosk (Elmwood, Conn.: Potes & Poets, 2001). She has also published four chapbooks: If Leaf, Then Arpeggio, Rogue Embryo, Magnus Loop, and Plastic Heaven. Her poetry is widely published in journals in the United States, Canada, Australia, and the United Kingdom, and has been translated into Spanish and German.

Martin is also co-editor and co-translator with John P. Clark of two books: Anarchy, Geography, Modernity: The Radical Social Thought of Elisée Reclus (Lanham, JD: Lexington Books, 2004) and A Voyage to New Orleans: Anarchist Impressions of the Old South (Warner, NH: Glad Day Books, 1999, 2004).

From 2006 to 2010, she taught literature and writing at Ryerson University, where she served as an editor for the literary journal White Wall, co-curated the poetry reading series Live Poets Society, and hosted a monthly edition of the literary program In Other Words on CKLN-FM.

Martin regularly writes essays about poetry and the visual arts at her blog, Rogue Embryo. She also maintains a website, CamilleMartin.ca, about her poetry and collage.

Published works

Poetry books and chapbooks
 Blueshift Road. Toronto: Rogue Embryo Press, 2021.
 Looms. Bristol, U.K.: Shearsman Books, 2012.
 Sonnets. Exeter, U.K.: Shearsman Books, 2010.
 Codes of Public Sleep. Toronto: BookThug, 2007.
 Sesame Kiosk. Elmwood, Conn.: Potes & Poets Press, 2001.
 If Leaf, Then Arpeggio. Ottawa: Above/Ground Press, 2011.
 Magnus Loop. Tucson: Chax Press, 1999.
 Rogue Embryo. New Orleans: Lavender Ink, 1999.
 Plastic Heaven. New Orleans: Single-author issue of Fell Swoop, 1996.

Other books
 A Voyage to New Orleans: Anarchist Impressions of the Old South (co-translator and co-editor, with John P. Clark). Warner, NH: Glad Day Books, 1999, 2004.
 The Radical Social Thought of Elisée Reclus (co-translator and co-editor, with John P. Clark). Lanham, JD: Lexington Books, 2004.

Anthologies
 Nine from Sonnets (in Spanish translation). La alteración del silencio: Poesía norteamericana reciente (The Alteration of Silence: Recent North American Poetry). Eds. William Allegrezza and Galo Ghigliotto. Santiago, Chile: Editorial Cuneta, 2010.
 Onsets. The Gig: Toronto, 2004. n.p..
 Another South: Experimental Writing in the South. Tuscaloosa, Ala.: University of Alabama Press, 2002. 133.
 Other Sticky Valentines. Lazy Frog Press, 2002. 6.
 From a Bend in the River. New Orleans: Runagate Press, 1998. 126-27.
 The Maple Leaf Rag: Fifteenth Anniversary Anthology. New Orleans: Portals Press, 1994. 115.

References

External links 
 https://web.archive.org/web/20100606164421/http://www.shearsman.com/pages/books/catalog/2010/martin.html
 http://www.rogueembryo.com
 https://web.archive.org/web/20170421064848/http://camillemartin.ca/
 http://epc.buffalo.edu/authors/martinc/
 https://web.archive.org/web/20131018142415/http://newpages.com/bookreviews/default_files/archive/2010-12-01/
 http://robmclennan.blogspot.ca/2012/10/camille-martin-looms.html
 http://www.bookslut.com/poetry/2013_02_019866.php
 http://galatearesurrection16.blogspot.ca/2011/03/sonnets-by-camille-martin.html

1956 births
Living people
20th-century Canadian poets
21st-century Canadian poets
American expatriate writers in Canada
Canadian women poets
Eastman School of Music alumni
Poets from Louisiana
Louisiana State University alumni
Academic staff of Toronto Metropolitan University
University of New Orleans alumni
Canadian collage artists
Women collage artists
Canadian women artists
American women poets
20th-century Canadian women writers
21st-century Canadian women writers
20th-century American poets
20th-century American women artists
American women academics